Bay Parkway may refer to:
Bay Parkway (Brooklyn) in Brooklyn, New York City
Bay Parkway (IND Culver Line), a subway station at McDonald Avenue; serving the 
Bay Parkway (BMT Sea Beach Line), a subway station at West Seventh Street; serving the 
Bay Parkway (BMT West End Line), a subway station at 86th Street; serving the 
Bay Parkway (Jones Beach) in Jones Beach State Park in Nassau County, New York